Poland competed at the 2004 Summer Paralympics in Athens, Greece. The team included 104 athletes, 70 men and 34 women. Competitors from Poland won 54 medals, including 10 gold, 25 silver and 19 bronze to finish 18th in the medal table.

Medallists

Sports

Archery

Men

|-
|align=left|Ryszard Bukanski
|align=left rowspan=3|Men's individual standing
|609
|6
|Bye
|L 143-150
|colspan=4|did not advance
|-
|align=left|Tomasz Lezanski
|611
|4
|Bye
|W 149-147
|W 95-89
|W 97-88
|L 103-103 *
|
|-
|align=left|Ryszard Olejnik
|605
|8
|Bye
|L 143-153
|colspan=4|did not advance
|-
|align=left|Janusz Marian Mulyk
|align=left rowspan=2|Men's individual W2
|564
|25
|L 148-159
|colspan=5|did not advance
|-
|align=left|Piotr Sawicki
|614
|9
|L 137-153
|colspan=5|did not advance
|-
|align=left|Ryszard Bukanski Tomasz Lezanski Piotr Sawicki
|align=left|Men's team open
|1834
|5
|N/A
|W 221-210
|L 209-221
|colspan=3|did not advance
|}

 Tomasz Lezanski's gold medal match was won by additional medals. He lost 5-8 to Slovakian paralympic archer Imrich Lyocsa who took the gold medal while Lezanski won the silver medal.

Women

|-
|align=left|Alicja Bukanska
|align=left rowspan=3|Women's individual standing
|515
|14
|N/A
|L 121-140
|colspan=4|did not advance
|-
|align=left|Malgorzata Olejnik
|583
|3
|N/A
|W 140-121
|W 99-95
|L 80-98
|W 93-77
|
|-
|align=left|Wieslawa Wolak
|527
|10
|N/A
|L 128-130
|colspan=4|did not advance
|-
|align=left|Alicja Bukanska Malgorzata Olejnik Wieslawa Wolak
|align=left|Women's team open
|1625
|5
|colspan=2|N/A
|L 168-210
|colspan=3|did not advance
|}

Athletics

Men's track

Men's field

Women's track

Women's field

Cycling

Men's road

Men's track

Equestrian

Powerlifting

Men

Women

Shooting

Men

Women

Swimming

Men

Women

Table tennis

Men

Women

Teams

Wheelchair fencing

Men

Women

Teams

Wheelchair tennis

Men

Women

See also
Poland at the Paralympics
Poland at the 2004 Summer Olympics

References 

Nations at the 2004 Summer Paralympics
2004
Summer Paralympics